Lucius Opimius was a Roman politician who held the consulship in 121 BC, in which capacity and year he ordered the execution of 3,000 supporters of popular leader Gaius Gracchus without trial, using as pretext the state of emergency declared after Gracchus's recent and turbulent death.

Biography 
He is first mentioned for crushing the revolt of the town of Fregellae in 125 BC. He was elected consul in 121 BC with Quintus Fabius Maximus Allobrogicus, and while Fabius was campaigning in Gaul, he took part in perhaps the most decisive event of Roman history to that point.

When Gaius Gracchus and M. Fulvius Flaccus were defeated for re-election by Opimius and Fabius, Gracchus organized a mass protest on the Aventine Hill. Alarmed by this action, the Senate passed the motion senatus consultum ultimum, which Opimius understood as an order to suppress their activities by any means necessary—including force. He gathered an armed force of Senators and their supporters, and confronted Gracchus and his followers, an act which quickly became a pitched battle inside the city of Rome. Gracchus, Flaccus, and many of their followers were slain in this conflict, and after clearing the streets of his opponents, Opimius established a quaestio or tribunal that condemned to death 3,000 people accused of being supporters of Gracchus.

Opimius was prosecuted for these violent actions in 120 BC, but Carbo won his acquittal. Opimius' victory established the senatus consultum ultimum in Roman constitutional practice, providing a limitless tool that the various Roman factions used against each other in the following years as the Republic slipped increasingly into violence and civil war.

In 116 BC, Opimius headed a commission that divided Numidia between Jugurtha and his brother Adherbal. Suspecting that the commission had been influenced by bribes from Jugurtha, its members were later investigated by a tribunal that censured their conduct. Humiliated, Opimius went into exile in Dyrrhachium, where he later died.

References

Ancient Roman generals
2nd-century BC Roman consuls
Ancient Roman exiles
Opimii
Optimates